
Gmina Nowe Ostrowy is a rural gmina (administrative district) in Kutno County, Łódź Voivodeship, in central Poland.

Villages
Gmina Nowe Ostrowy contains the villages and settlements of Błota, Bzówki, Bzówki PGR, Grochów, Grochówek, Grodno, Grodno Drugie, Imielinek, Imielinek Drugi, Imielno, Kały-Towarzystwo, Kołomia, Lipiny, Miksztal, Niechcianów, Nowa Wieś, Nowe Ostrowy, Nowe Ostrowy PKP, Ostrowy, Ostrowy PGR, Ostrowy-Cukrownia, Perna, Rdutów, Wola Pierowa, Wołodrza and Zieleniec.

Neighbouring gminas
Gmina Nowe Ostrowy is bordered by the gminas of Dąbrowice, Krośniewice, Kutno, Łanięta and Lubień Kujawski.

References
Polish official population figures 2006

Nowe Ostrowy
Kutno County